Allan William Ordway (May 8, 1917 – September 7, 1999) was an American gridiron football player and coach of football, basketball, and baseball.  He served as the head football coach at Jamestown College—now known as the University of Jamestown—in Jamestown, North Dakota from 1949 to 1950 seasons, compiling a record of 5–11.

Ordway played football for the Winnipeg Blue Bombers of the Canadian Football League (CFL) in the early 1940s.

He died of a rare lung disease, pseudomonas, in 1999. He had been in declining health in the recent years leading up to his death. He was cremated with his ashes scattered at a park.

Head coaching record

College football

References

1917 births
1999 deaths
American football fullbacks
Basketball coaches from North Dakota
Alaska Nanooks men's basketball coaches
Jamestown Jimmies football coaches
Lewis–Clark State Warriors baseball coaches
North Dakota Fighting Hawks football players
Rowan Profs men's basketball coaches
Winnipeg Blue Bombers players
High school basketball coaches in Alaska
People from Mandan, North Dakota
Wilmington Clippers players